Energy in Uruguay describes energy and electricity production, consumption and import in Uruguay.  

As part of climate mitigation measures and an energy transformation, Uruguay has converted over 98% of its electrical grid to sustainable energy sources (primarily solar, wind, and hydro). 

Fossil fuels are primarily imported into Uruguay for transportation, industrial uses and applications like domestic cooking.

Overview
Historically, energy has been a stronghold of state-owned companies, such as UTE and ANCAP.

The National Directorate of Energy is the main governmental body in charge of energy policies.

The Global Economic Crisis of 2008 made many of the materials to produce renewable energy cheaper, therefore Uruguay decided it would be the best time to develop their clean energy sector, heavily investing in 2011 and 2012. This has helped increase the country's output immediately. These projects are all developed by the Uruguayan Energy Policies of 2005-2030.

Uruguay is notable for its use of renewable energies, which provide over 94.5% of the country’s electricity and 55% of the country's total energy mix.

Electricity

Nuclear

Renewables

Fossil fuel use 
Fossil fuels are largely imported into Uruguay for transportation and industrial uses. The high import costs, and the rapid transition to renewables on the electricity grid has increasingly made fossil fuels less important.

Petroleum

Fossil gas

See also 
Electricity sector in Uruguay 
 Nuclear power in Uruguay
 Petroleum in Uruguay
 Renewable energy in Uruguay
 Wind power in Uruguay
 List of power stations in Uruguay

Notes

References